Otis Wilber Francis (February 14, 1891 – May 5, 1940), nicknamed "Cat", was an American Negro league infielder between 1909 and 1920.

A native of Indianapolis, Indiana, Francis made his Negro leagues debut in 1909 for the Indianapolis ABCs. He played several seasons for Indianapolis, and also played for the Chicago Union Giants. Francis died in Indianapolis in 1940 at age 49.

References

External links
 and Baseball-Reference Black Baseball stats and Seamheads

1891 births
1940 deaths
Indianapolis ABCs players
20th-century African-American sportspeople
Baseball infielders